Gregory J. Hayes (born 1960/61) is an American businessman. He was the chairman and CEO of United Technologies from September 2016 to April 2020, and is now the CEO of Raytheon Technologies.

Early life and education
Hayes grew up in Williamsville, New York, and was a 1978 graduate of Williamsville South High School.  Hayes played football at Cornell University, while studying pre-law for a year, then transferred to the Krannert School of Management at Purdue University, where he earned a Bachelor of Economics degree, in 1982. He later became a CPA.

Career 
After graduating, Hayes joined Sundstrand Corporation, which was acquired by United Technologies (UTC) in 1999. He rose through management, becoming CEO of UTC in November 2014, succeeding Louis R. Chênevert. Hayes was elected chairman in September 2016.

In April 2020, Raytheon Company completed their merger with UTC to form Raytheon Technologies. Hayes was named CEO of the combined company, and Raytheon chairman and CEO Thomas A. Kennedy was named executive chairman.

In September 2022, Foreign Ministry of China spokesperson Mao Ning announced at a press briefing that China has imposed sanctions on Hayes and Boeing Defense, Space & Security CEO Theodore Colbert III, in response to the U.S. arms sale to Taiwan. It is not immediately known what the Chinese sanctions against Hayes and Colbert would entail, and it is often mainly symbolic in nature.

Boards and affiliations
Hayes served on President Trump’s American Manufacturing Council in January 2017, until resigning, in August 2017.

He is a member of Business Roundtable and serves on the board of directors for Nucor.

References

1960s births
Living people
American chief executives
Krannert School of Management alumni
United Technologies people
Raytheon Technologies people